George of Hanover may refer to:
George I of Hanover, also George I of Great Britain
George II of Hanover, also George II of Great Britain
George III of Hanover, also George III of the United Kingdom
George IV of Hanover, also George IV of the United Kingdom
George V of Hanover, not the same as George V of the United Kingdom